Ulrich van den Berg (born 13 January 1975) is a South African professional golfer.

Van den Berg was born in East London. He had a successful amateur career which peaked in 1997 when he won the South African Amateur Strokeplay Championship, the Transvaal Amateur, and the Western Province Strokeplay Championship. He turned professional in 1999 and joined the Sunshine Tour. He has several tournament victories on the tour, all on the less lucrative "Winter Swing".

Van den Berg played on the European Tour in 2008 having won his card at qualifying school at the end of 2007. Having been unable to play in more than 10 tournaments in his rookie season due to family reasons, he was granted a conditional card for 2009 on a medical exemption, but failed to win enough money to retain his playing status.

Amateur highlights
 1997 South African Strokeplay, Transvaal Amateur, Western Province Strokeplay

Professional wins (7)

Sunshine Tour wins (7)

Sunshine Tour playoff record (1–3)

See also
2007 European Tour Qualifying School graduates
2015 European Tour Qualifying School graduates

References

External links

South African male golfers
Sunshine Tour golfers
European Tour golfers
Golfers from Johannesburg
Sportspeople from East London, Eastern Cape
White South African people
1975 births
Living people